The Jeep Cherokee (KL) is a compact crossover SUV manufactured and marketed by the Jeep marque of Stellantis North America. Introduced for model year 2014 at the 2013 New York International Auto Show, sales began in November 2013. It occupied a position between the smaller Compass and the larger Grand Cherokee in Jeep's global lineup. Production at the Belvidere Assembly plant ended on February 28, 2023.

Overview 
Jeep previewed the fifth generation Cherokee in February 2013, shortly after the releasing the Compass, Patriot, and Grand Cherokee. The Cherokee  debuted at the New York International Auto Show on  March 27, 2013. The North American market saw the Cherokee nameplate for the first time since the 2001 departure of the Cherokee (XJ). Other markets retained the Cherokee name with the introduction of the Liberty in the North American markets.

The Cherokee is the first Jeep vehicle to use the Fiat Compact Wide platform, which was co-developed by Chrysler and Fiat.

The Jeep Cherokee can be equipped with three different four-wheel drive systems: Active Drive I, Active Drive II, and Active Drive Lock. All of these systems come with Jeep's Selec-Terrain traction control system and rear-axle disconnect feature. The rear axle disconnect feature, a first for Compact SUV, disconnects the rear-axle when four-wheel drive is not needed. This lowers parasitic drivetrain load; which improves fuel efficiency.

Trim levels

The Cherokee is available in several trim levels:

Sport (2014-2018)
The Sport served as the base model between 2014 and 2018. It includes seventeen-inch steel wheels, the Uconnect 5.0 touch screen radio, six speakers, cloth seating surfaces, a 2.4 L Tigershark I4 engine, and nine-speed ZF automatic transmission. It comes in both 4x2 and 4x4 configurations. In 2015, the 3.2 L Pentastar V6 also became available on this model. Seventeen-inch alloy wheels are available as part of the Sport Appearance Package. The Sport was replaced with the Latitude starting in 2019.

Latitude (2014-2023)
The Latitude adds alloy wheels and body-colored door handles and side view mirrors. It comes in both 4x2 and 4x4. In Canada, the model is dubbed North 4x2 or North 4x4. The "Latitude" comes with the 8.4" Uconnect and premium sound option as standard, whereas on the "North" it is an optional upgrade. There is an Altitude model that was introduced in spring 2014 that is based on the Latitude model and adds black alloy wheels and blacked-out accents. The Latitude model will be Jeep's volume seller of the Cherokee line. The Latitude became the new base model Cherokee in 2019, replacing the Sport, and a new Latitude Plus trim was introduced to take the place of the old Latitude model. For 2021, a new Latitude Lux trim adds some of the features found on the Limited trim, such as Nappa luxury leather-trimmed seating surfaces, the U Connect 4 8.4 touchscreen infotainment system, and dual heated front seats. Base Latitude and Latitude Plus trims were discontinued for the 2022 model year, although the Latitude Lux trim remains available.

X (2022-2023)

The X trim became available in 2022. Building off of the base Altitude trim, the X adds Trailhawk-inspired exterior styling, combination vinyl-and-cloth-trimmed seating surfaces, dual heated front seats, and a heated leather-wrapped steering wheel.

Trailhawk (2014-2022)
The Trailhawk adds dark-colored alloy wheels, the Uconnect 8.4A touch screen radio with 9-1-1 emergency assistance, roadside assistance, and support for apps. It comes in 4x4 model only, is Trail Rated®, and is a far more off-road capable model.  The Trailhawk includes recovery hooks for towing a stuck vehicle and a mechanical rear locker. Both Trailhawk L and Trailhawk Elite models became available starting in 2017, adding uplevel features to the base Trailhawk model.

Limited (2014-2023)
The Limited serves as the top-of-the-line model, and adds bright-finished alloy wheels, and leather seating surfaces. It comes in both 4x2 and 4x4. It also adds the U Connect ACCESS 8.4A touch-screen infotainment system, heated dual front seats, and Keyless Go with push-button and remote starter systems.

Altitude Edition (2015-2021)

The Altitude Edition was based on the midlevel Latitude model, and adds features to the model such as gloss black eighteen-inch alloy wheels, a black lower front fascia accent, gloss black grille surrounds, gloss black roof rails, gloss black exterior badges, black window surround moldings, and an all-black leather interior. Also included is Chrysler's award-winning U Connect ACCESS 8.4A radio, with an A/M-F/M stereo, SIRIUS-XM Satellite Radio, an optional single-disc player (mounted in the center console), iPod and USB input jacks, a 3.5-millimeter auxiliary audio input jack, U Connect ACCESS W/ hands-free calling, 9-1-1 Assist, Wi-Fi connectivity for wireless internet access in the vehicle, wireless audio streaming, voice command, a full color touch-screen display, optional Garmin GPS navigation, and more. The model became available in 2015, and has a base price of $25,495.00 MSRP, up only $600.00 MSRP from the Latitude model it is based on, and is only available in Granite Crystal Metallic, Billet Silver Metallic, Bright White Clear Coat, or Brilliant Black Crystal Pearl Coat Metallic, all of which complement the gloss black exterior accents. The Altitude Edition trim was discontinued following the 2021 model year.

Overland (2016-2020)

Introduced in 2016, the Cherokee Overland is the top-of-the-line, and most luxurious, Cherokee trim level in the United States. In addition to the previously top-of-the-line Limited trim level, it adds color-keyed front and rear fascias with chrome accents, color-keyed wheel wells, 18-inch polished alloy wheels, U-Connect Access 8.4 infotainment system with navigation, 9-speaker 506-Watt Alpine premium sound system, heated and ventilated leather seats, and a leather and wood-trimmed heated steering wheel.

The Overland offers either the 184-horsepower 2.4 L Tigershark inline four-cylinder (I4) engine, or the 271-horsepower 3.2L Pentastar V6 engine with Stop-and-Go Technology, as well as two wheel drive or four wheel drive (with Jeep's "Active-Drive II" transfer case).

The Overland trim was discontinued following the 2020 model year, due to slow sales, as well as being similarly equipped to the Limited trim. The High Altitude Edition takes the Overland's place at the top of the Cherokee lineup for the 2021 model year.

75th Anniversary (2016) and 80th Anniversary (2021) Editions

In addition, a 75th Anniversary Edition model made its debut in spring 2016 to celebrate Jeep's 75th anniversary. Based on the Latitude trim level of the Cherokee, exclusive features include a Recon Green Metallic exterior paint color option, unique 75th Anniversary Edition exterior emblems, bronze-painted exterior accents, bronze-painted eighteen-inch (18") alloy wheels, premium cloth seating surfaces with "Ombre" mesh inserts and 75th Anniversary Edition embroidery, and bronze-accented interior trim. The U Connect ACCESS 8.4A infotainment system, as well as a full panoramic power moonroof are both standard on this model, as is deep-tinted glass and automatic front head and fog lamps. A similar 80th Anniversary Edition, celebrating Jeep's 80th anniversary, was also available for 2021.

Production

The Cherokee began production in the spring of 2013. Jeep pushed back the release date of the Cherokee to allow time for the development of the nine-speed automatic transmission by ZF. The new Cherokee arrived at dealerships in mid-fall 2013.

In late summer 2013, Jeep temporarily ceased production of its all-new Cherokee due to a transmission software issue. A few thousand Cherokees had already been produced, and would remain at the factory until a fix could be issued. In October 2013, a software fix was issued to the Cherokee, resuming production of the vehicle, and shipped it to dealerships in the U.S. By November the sales have started well in both the US and Canada, with at least four weeks of stock depletion due to pre-order. Chrysler has stated on 11 December 2013 the Cherokee advertisement campaign with the tagline Built Free to be the most successful one since the introduction of the 2011 Dodge Charger.

The Cherokee was introduced in Europe in the spring of 2014. To meet the demands of European buyers the model was fitted with one or more diesel powertrains, most likely one or more versions of the FIAT Multijet engine with a displacement of 2.0L and 170 PS (125 kW; 168 hp).

Production in Toledo ended in spring 2017. 949,151 units were built between 2013 and 2017.

FCA moved production of the Jeep Cherokee to their Belvidere Assembly facility, where the Jeep Compass and Jeep Patriot, as well as the Dodge Dart (PF) were produced until 2016. The Belvidere Assembly facility did not have to be retooled in order to produce the Cherokee, and the production change took place after the Dart was discontinued following the 2017 model year.  FCA invested $700M into the plant and added 700 jobs to the Toledo North.

The Belvidere Assembly Plant ceased production of the Cherokee on February 28, 2023.

Powertrain

The Cherokee is Chrysler's first product to feature the all-new engine.

Cherokees for sale in the United States feature Chrysler's new nine-speed automatic transmission, designed by ZF and manufactured by Chrysler. Cherokees for sale in Europe may feature a 6 speed manual transmission. Not only is the Cherokee the first Chrysler vehicle to feature a nine-speed transmission, it is the first sport utility vehicle to feature a nine-speed transmission. The transmission yields approximately two additional miles per gallon with the V6 engine option compared to a six speed automatic.

New for the 2019 model year is the 2.0 L "Hurricane" turbo inline-4 (I4) gasoline engine.  It delivers 270 hp at 5200 rpm and 295 lbft of torque between 3000 and 4500 rpm with the help of direct fuel injection.

Front-wheel-drive and four-wheel-drive models are available, with Jeep's Selec-Terrain system being available on the latter. These are named differently depending on the markets, with the FWD being slightly less expensive.

Following the 2021 model year, the 2.4 L "Tigershark" Inline Four-Cylinder (I4) engine was discontinued, and the 3.2L Pentastar VVT V6 engine became standard equipment on all Cherokee models for 2022. The 2.0L "Hurricane" Turbocharged Inline Four-Cylinder (I4) engine remains an option on most models. The 2.4L "Tigershark" Inline Four-Cylinder (I4) engine was discontinued from the Cherokee lineup to help differentiate it from the Jeep Compass, where the 2.4L I4 is its sole engine option.

Transmission issues
The Cherokee was the first vehicle to market to use ZF's new 9-speed automatic transaxle. It features an unconventional design that reduces its size and increases fuel economy over more conventional transmissions, but increases its complexity. The initial release of the Cherokee was delayed several weeks citing quality concerns with the transmission, and multiple reports of issues with shift quality and reliability surfaced shortly after launch. Both 2014 and 2015 Cherokees have a high number of consumer complaints on safecar.gov and carcomplaints.com compared to similar models of its class, with the vast majority of complaints being related to the transmission. FCA's chief quality officer was forced to leave shortly after a poor Consumer Reports review on the dependability of models including the Cherokee, and so far Chrysler has released 3 software updates for the 2014-2015 Cherokee transmission. The company continues to assert that the problem is software related. However, Chrysler is repairing some Cherokee models' transmission "snap ring" to address durability concerns. Multiple vehicles that use the same ZF model transmission, such as the Range Rover Evoque, Honda Pilot, Acura TLX, Chrysler 200, and even the similarly built Jeep Renegade have had issues of varying severity as well. ZF, the transmission's designer, also insists that the issue is with software, and would not comment on any improvements being made.  As of August 2016, ZF has issued a recall regarding the 9 speed automatic transmission affecting 505,000 vehicles.  ZF is quoted for suggesting the issues are related to a faulty control sensor could cause the transmission to randomly drop into neutral while driving.

These transmission issues delayed the release of the all-new 2014 Jeep Cherokee KL to consumers until late summer 2014.

Software hack 
In July 2015, FCA issued a recall of 1.4 million vehicles after a software glitch was discovered which would allow hackers to wirelessly hijack vehicles and electronically control vital functions. IT security researchers Charlie Miller and Chris Valasek hacked a 2014 Jeep Cherokee and gained access to the car over the Internet, which allowed them to control the vehicle's radio, A/C, and windshield wipers, as well as the Cherokee's steering, brakes and transmission. Chrysler published a patch that car owners can download and install via a USB stick, or have a car dealer install for them.

The software glitch impacted the 2014-2015 Jeep Cherokee, as well as the 2015 Chrysler 200, the 2015 Chrysler 300, the 2015 Dodge Charger, the 2015 Dodge Challenger, the 2013-2014 SRT and Dodge Viper, the 2014-2015 Jeep Grand Cherokee (WK2), and the 2013-2015 Ram Truck 1500'through 5500. All vehicles were equipped with either the U Connect 3C 8.4A (RA3) or the U Connect 3C 8.4AN (RA4) infotainment systems, which featured U Connect ACCESS, and used a Sprint 3G CDMA wireless connection in the vehicle to access services and apps. Vehicles equipped with the U Connect 2 3.0/3.0BT (RA1), the U Connect 3 5.0BT (RA2), and the U Connect 6.5A (RA4) were unaffected by the software glitch, as those radios did NOT feature a built-in wireless connection. Vehicles equipped with the older U Connect 3 8.4A (RE2) and the older U Connect 8.4N (RB5) infotainment systems were also unaffected for the same reason.

Facelift

The restyled 2019 Jeep Cherokee KL made its debut at the 2018 North American International Auto Show in Detroit, Michigan on January 16, 2018.

The front grille on the Cherokee has been moved down slightly to allow for larger front headlamps with LED daytime running lamps (DRL's), and the turn signals are now integrated into the front headlamps. All trim levels of the new Cherokee receive new wheel designs. The rear end of the 2019 Cherokee resembles the rear end of the second-generation Jeep Compass, with similar LED rear tail lamps.

On the interior, the Cherokee has changed little from the pre-facelifted 2014-18 version. Some trim levels of the Cherokee receive new seat fabrics, and all trim levels receive improved interior materials (all trim levels receive new interior color schemes). The infotainment systems have also been upgraded to the fourth-generation U Connect 4 systems. The base system (U Connect 4 7.0) replaces the previous U Connect 3 5.0BT radio on base trim levels, and the U Connect 4C 8.4 systems replace the U Connect 3C systems, adding 4G LTE Wi Fi connectivity, SiriusXM Guardian service for either six months when not equipped with GPS navigation, or one year when equipped with GPS navigation. All systems receive an improved User Interface (UI), and standard Apple CarPlay and Android Auto The larger U Connect 4C 8.4 systems integrate with the SiriusXM Guardian smartphone application for iOS and Android, as well as an application for smartwatches such as the Apple Watch and Android Wear devices, as well as integration with Amazon Alexa (Amazon Echo) devices, which was first introduced on the 2018 Cherokee Latitude Plus with the Tech Connect Package (the Latitude Plus with Tech Connect Package is no longer available for 2019, as its features have been integrated into the 2019 Jeep Cherokee lineup).

Engine choices for the 2019 Cherokee include the previously available 180-horsepower 2.4L Multi-Air Inline Four-Cylinder (I4) and the 271-horsepower 3.2L Pentastar VVT V6 gasoline-powered units, though the V6 engine now comes as standard equipment on the upper trim levels of the Cherokee, where it was previously optional. However, a new engine, the 2.0L Hurricane Turbocharged Inline Four-Cylinder (I4) engine is now available on higher trim levels of the Cherokee, and produces 270 horsepower. All engines remain mated to a ZF-manufactured 948TE 9-speed automatic transmission, with a choice of either Front Wheel Drive (FWD) or Four Wheel Drive (4WD). All engines and transmissions receive improvements for improved reliability and fuel economy.

While only the uplevel Limited and Trailhawk trims were shown at its debut, the 2019 Jeep Cherokee will be available in Latitude, Latitude Plus, Limited, Trailhawk, Overland, and Trailhawk Elite trims. The Latitude trim replaces the previous base Sport trim for 2019. The all-new 2019 Cherokee went on sale at Jeep dealerships in the United States in early 2018 as an early 2019 model year vehicle.

Production of the Jeep Cherokee was relocated from the Toledo Complex in Toledo, Ohio to the Belvidere Assembly Plant in Belvidere, Illinois that once produced the first-generation Jeep Compass MK and Jeep Patriot, and the Dodge Dart (PF), in late 2017 in order to accommodate production of the all-new 2018 Jeep Wrangler (JL). Both plants received an extensive retooling in order to produce their respective vehicles. The Belvidere Assembly Plant temporarily closed for retooling following production of the final 2017 Jeep Compass MK and Jeep Patriot in December 2016.

Fiat Chrysler Automobiles has released a television commercial for the United States market restyled 2019 Cherokee, entitled "The World Comes With It", which also appears on the manufacturer's website for the vehicle.

2022 Changes

For 2022, the Jeep Cherokee lineup is revised with a simplified model lineup, with Latitude, Latitude Plus, Altitude, and High Altitude trims being discontinued, as well as a new X trim being introduced. The new X trim, which replaces the Latitude Plus, includes all of the standard equipment of the now-discontinued Latitude Plus trim, but adds seventeen-inch (17") polished aluminum-alloy wheels with black accents, as well as combination cloth and vinyl-trimmed seating surfaces, off-road suspension, off-road body side cladding and front and rear wheel flares, a full-size spare tire and wheel, unique front hood and side decals with Gloss Black badging, a Matte Black rear tow hook, heated front seats, a heated leather-wrapped multifunction steering wheel, an eight-way, power-adjustable front driver's seat with lumbar support, all-season front and rear floor mats, rain-sensitive front windshield wipers, and a front windshield wiper de-icer system. To help further differentiate the Cherokee from the Jeep Compass, the previous 2.4L "Tigershark" Inline Four-Cylinder (I4) gasoline engine has been discontinued, with the 3.2L Pentastar VVT V6 engine becoming standard equipment on all models, and the 2.0L "Hurricane" Turbocharged Inline Four-Cylinder (I4) still available as an option on all trims except for the base "X". The base U Connect 4 seven-inch (7.0") touchscreen infotainment system has also been discontinued, with the 8.4-inch (8.4") touchscreen with SiriusXM Satellite Radio with a one-year trial subscription becoming standard equipment on all models, and the Sun and Sound Group, containing a dual-pane panoramic power moonroof and the Alpine nine-speaker premium amplified surround-sound audio system with a subwoofer now optional on all models. All models except for the mid-level Latitude Lux trim, now include standard four wheel drive featuring Jeep's "Selec-Terrain" terrain management system.

The mid-level Latitude Lux trim now gains ventilated front seats, as well as a power-adjustable front passenger seat with lumbar support, while the Limited trim gains standard SiriusXM Guardian telematics services with a one-year trial subscription, as well as features such as parallel and perpendicular automatic parking assist, a lane departure warning system, a dual-pane panoramic power moonroof, and lane keeping assist as standard equipment. One new exterior paint color, "Earl", is also available for 2022.

Other markets
The Jeep Cherokee returned to the Chinese market in October 2015 for the 2016 model year since production ended 10 years earlier with the Jeep Cherokee (XJ). The new Jeep Cherokee (KL) is now assembled by GAC Fiat Chrysler in Changsha. A 2.4 litre engine was available paired to a 9 speed automatic gearbox until 2017 alongside the 2 litre naturally aspirated petrol engine. 2019 models were available with the 2 litre naturally aspirated petrol engine producing  and 2 litre turbocharged engine producing  from Tigershark paired to a 9 speed automatic gearbox. 8 trim levels are currently available for purchase and pricing ranges from 185,800 yuan to 319,800 yuan (26,830 to US$46,180) with the pre-facelift and facelift models sold together as of 2019. The pre-facelift version is known as New Cherokee Classic while the latter is known as the New Cherokee.

Sales

Safety

Euro NCAP

2013

2019 
The Cherokee in its standard European configuration received 4 stars from Euro NCAP in 2019.

IIHS
The 2022 Cherokee was safety tested by the IIHS:

Awards

As of February 2014, the 2014 Cherokee was the top-ranked Affordable Compact SUV in U.S. News & World Report's rankings.

Notes

References

External links
Cherokee Official Website

Cherokee (KL)
Compact sport utility vehicles
Crossover sport utility vehicles
All-wheel-drive vehicles
Front-wheel-drive vehicles
Euro NCAP small off-road
Cars introduced in 2013
Motor vehicles manufactured in the United States